Bayerischer Poetentaler is a Bavarian literary prize of the writers guild Münchner Turmschreiber.

Winners 
Source:

1961–1969 
 1961: Joseph Maria Lutz – Eduard Stemplinger – Alfred Weitnauer
 1962: Benno Hubensteiner – Ernst Hoferichter – Hanns Vogel
 1963: Hugo Lang – Adolf Roth – Eugen Roth
 1964: Gustl Feldmeier – Josef Martin Bauer – Alois Fink
 1965: Richard Billinger – Carl Orff – Erwin Schleich
 1966: Bernhard Ücker – Ludwig Schrott – Karl Spengler
 1967: Marieluise Fleißer – Arthur Maximilian Miller – Wugg Retzer
 1968: Wastl Fanderl – Herbert Schindler – Anton Schnack – Friedrich Schnack
 1969: Reinhard Raffalt – Rudolf Kriß – Herbert Schneider

1970–1979 
 1970: Hans Bleibrunner – Hans Fitz – Oskar Weber
 1971: Otto Kraus – Paul Ernst Rattelmüller – Hans Wimmer – Roider Jackl
 1972: Hannes König – Michl Lang – Georg Lohmeier – Otto Schemm
 1973: Martin Lankes – Arthur Piechler – Sigi Sommer
 1974: Annette Thoma – Emil Vierlinger – Werner A. Widmann – Capella Monacensis
 1975: Eva Vaitl – Wolfgang Johannes Beckh – Paul Friedl (Baumsteftenlenz) – Stefan Schaller
 1976: Günter Göpfert – Helmut Kirchammer – Michael Schattenhofer – Regensburger Domspatzen
 1977: Ludwig Hollweg – Robert Münster – Anton Neuhäusler (alias Franz Ringseis) – 
 1978: Alix du Frenes – Wilhelm Lukas Kristl – Anton Wandinger – Franz Xaver Breitenfellner – die Förderer der Landshuter Hochzeit
 1979: Werner Egk – Helmut Zöpfl – Georg Blädel – Josef Eberwein

1980–1989 
 1980: Franz von Bayern – Erich Hartstein – Hans Pletzer – Ludwig Schmid-Wildy
 1981: Augsburger Puppenkiste – Hans Hösl – Ludwig Kusche – Fritz Straßner
 1982: Gustl Bayrhammer – Franziska Bilek – Alois Weichslgartner – Windsbacher Knabenchor
 1983: Wilhelm Ludwig – Josef Oberberger – Carl Oskar Renner – Walter Sedlmayr
 1984: Toni Berger – Fritz Meingast – Gerhard Schmidt-Gaden (Tölzer Knabenchor) – Dieter Wieland
 1985: Hans Breinlinger – Franz Freisleder – Hans Hotter – Jugend- und Musikkorps Bad Kissingen – Hans Pörnbacher
 1986: Hans Max von Aufseß – Michael Ende – Wolfgang Sawallisch – Werner Schlierf
 1987: Leopold Kammerer – Otfried Preußler – Marianne und Heinz Redmann – Karl-Heinz Schickhaus
 1988: Richard Lemp – Fred Rauch – Frieda Sembach-Krone – Sing- und Musizierkreis Seeon
 1989: Anton Besold – Alexander von Branca – Harald Dietl – Erni Singerl

1990–1999 
 1990: Leopold Ahlsen – Toni Goth – Franz Kuchler – Willy Purucker – Anna Wimschneider
 1991: Hans Berger – Walter Flemmer – Heino Hallhuber – Hans Prähofer
 1992: Ellis Kaut – Ernst Maria Lang – Herbert Rosendorfer – Rolf Alexander Wilhelm
 1993: Manfred Bacher – Werner und Nannette Bald – Werner Specht – Michael Stiegler
 1994: Fritz Fenzl – Enoch zu Guttenberg – Otto Meitinger – Hugo Strasser – Reiner Zimnik
 1995: Ernst Otto Fischer – Kurt Graunke – Odilo Lechner – Alfons Schweiggert
 1996: Florian Besold – Veronika Fitz – Peter Grassinger – Münchner Orchesterverein Wilde Gungl
 1997: Sepp Eibl – Hans Fischach – Georg Maier – Rudolf Seitz
 1998: Augsburger Domsingknaben – Ernst Krammer-Keck – Robert Naegele – Joseph Wahl
 1999: Armin Eichholz – Fraunhofer Saitenmusik – Klaus Kiermeier – Walter Lindermeier

2000–2009 
 2000: Werner Herzog – Wilfried Hiller – Ernestine Koch – Hans Nöhbauer
 2001: Ruth Drexel – Josef Steidle – Christian Ude – Sepp Winkler
 2002: Josef Fendl – Janosch – Christian Neubauer – Ensemble Zapf’nstreich
 2003: Silke Aichhorn – Margret Hölle – Helmut Seitz – Jutta Speidel 
 2004: Couplet-AG – Jörg Hube – Jutta Makowsky – Winfried Zehetmeier
 2005: Frank-Markus Barwasser – Hans-Jürgen Buchner – Gert Heidenreich – Erich Jooß – Lotte Roth-Wölfle
 2006: Hedi Heres – Dieter Hildebrandt – Walter Rupp – Günther Sigl und seine Spider Murphy Gang
 2007: Martha Schad – Michael Skasa – Notker Wolf
 2008: Biermösl Blosn – Gerhard Polt – Norbert Göttler – Reinhard Wittmann
 2009: Monika Baumgartner – Klaus Eberlein – Michael Groißmeier – Konstantin Wecker

2010–2019 
 2010: Franz Eder – Bruno Jonas – Monika Pauderer – Hans Roth
 2011: Markus Wasmeier – Jo Baier – Helmut Eckl – Münchner Saitentratzer
 2012: Bayerischer Rundfunk – Michael Lerchenberg – Josef M. Redl – Hardy Scharf
 2013: Gustl Bauer – Claudia Schlenger and Hanns Meilhamer (Herbert und Schnipsi) – Zither-Manä – Ilse Neubauer
 2014: Miroslav Nemec – Asta Scheib – Gisela Schneeberger – Traudi Siferlinger – Udo Wachtveitl
 2015: La Brass Banda – Anton G. Leitner – Marcus H. Rosenmüller – Christian Springer – Brigitte Walbrun
 2016: Werner Asam – Hans Göttler – Lisa Fitz – Elmar Wepper – Tanngrindler Musikanten
 2017: Fredl Fesl, Toni Drexler, Fitzgerald Kusz, Produktion "Rosenheim Cops"
 2018: Michaela May, Andreas Giebel, Friedrich Ani, Bob Ross ("Blechschaden")
 2019: Maria Peschek, Ludwig Zehetner, Christoph Süß

2020– 
 2022: Michaela Karl – Harald Grill – Luise Kinseher – Eisi Gulp

References

External links
  

Literary awards of Bavaria